The men's marathon at the 2011 IPC Athletics World Championships was held in the streets of Christchurch, New Zealand on 30 January.

British athlete David Weir, on January 29, pulled out of the marathon for safety reasons, as the roads around the circuit would not be closed to traffic. He was to compete in the classification T54 event.

British athlete and world record holder Richard Whitehead did not get to compete in a marathon event. He has a double leg amputation and is classified as T42. There was no T42 marathon event, because there were too few marathon runners with a single or double leg amputation. He was not allowed to run in the marathon T46 event (athletes with single above or below elbow amputation).

Medalists

T11
The Men's marathon, T11 was held on January 30

T11 = visual impairment: may range from no light perception in either eye to light perception with the inability to recognise the shape of a hand.

Results

Key:   CR = Championship Record, SB = Season Best, PB = Personal Best

T12
The Men's marathon, T12 was held on January 30

T12 = visual impairment: may recognise the shape of a hand and have a visual acuity of 2/60 and/or visual field of under 5 degrees.

Results

Key:   WR = World Record, PB = Personal Best

T46
The Men's marathon, T46 was held on January 30

T46 = single above or below elbow amputation or equivalent impairments.

Results

T54
The Men's marathon, T54 was held on January 30

T54 = normal upper limb function, partial to normal trunk function, may have significant function of the lower limbs.

Results

Key:   SB = Season Best, DNF = Did not Finish, DNS = Did not Start

See also
List of IPC world records in athletics

References
General
Schedule and results, Official site of the 2011 IPC Athletics World Championships
IPC Athletics Classification Explained, Scottish Disability Sport
Specific

Marathon
Marathons at the World Para Athletics Championships
IPC World Championships